The 2007–08 Macedonian Football Cup was the 16th season of Macedonia's football knockout competition. FK Vardar were the defending champions, having won their fifth title. The 2007–08 champions were FK Rabotnichki Kometal who won their first title.

Competition calendar

First round
The draw was held on 5 September 2007 in Skopje. Matches were played on 19 September 2007.

|colspan="3" style="background-color:#97DEFF" align=center|19 September 2007

|}

Second round
The draw was held on 17 October 2007 in Skopje. The first legs were played on 23 and 24 October and second on 6 and 7 November 2007.

|}

Quarter-finals
The draw was held on 17 November 2007 in Skopje. The first legs were played on 28 November and the second were played on 12 December 2007.

|}

Semi-finals
The draw was held on 12 January 2008 in Skopje. The first legs were played on 9 April and the second were played on 7 May 2008.

Summary

|}

Matches

1–1 on aggregate. Rabotnički won on away goals.

Milano won 6–1 on aggregate.

Sources: Dnevnik.mk (archived), Dnevnik.mk (archived)

Final

See also
2007–08 Macedonian First Football League
2007–08 Macedonian Second Football League

External links
 2007–08 Macedonian Football Cup at rsssf.org
 2007–08 Macedonian Football Cup at FFM.mk

Macedonia
Cup
Macedonian Football Cup seasons